Zodariellum is a genus of ant spiders mainly found in Central Asia. Their capture frequency and paralysis latency are different while capturing different ant species. First described in 1968 by Andreeva & Tyschchenko, many included species have been transferred to other genera and it now contains only one species, Zodariellum surprisum.

References

Zodariidae
Monotypic Araneomorphae genera
Spiders of Asia